Banknote building may refer to:
 American Bank Note Company Building, in Manhattan
 American Bank Note Company Printing Plant, in The Bronx